Morgan Airport  was a county-owned, public-use airport in Phillips County, Montana, United States. It is located 12 nautical miles (22 km) north of Loring, near Morgan.

As of August 15, 2014, the 7U4 FAA code is unknown in the FAA NASR system.

In the List of airports in Montana, it is listed as a notable former airport which closed circa 2008.

Facilities 
Morgan Airport covers an area of 21 acres (8 ha) at an elevation of 2,813 feet (857 m) above mean sea level.

It has one runway designated 7/25 with a turf surface measuring 3,000 by 75 feet (914 x 23 m).

See also 
 List of airports in Montana

References

External links 
 Aerial image as of August 1996 from USGS The National Map
 

Defunct airports in the United States
Airports in Montana
Transportation in Phillips County, Montana
Buildings and structures in Phillips County, Montana